Pierre Antonini is a retired French mathematics professor and amateur astronomer who has discovered several minor planets and two supernovae at his private Observatoire de Bédoin (Bedoin Observatory; observatory code: 132) located at Bédoin, southeastern France. For many of his discoveries he used a 16-cm telescope or a 30-cm telescope.

He is a prolific discoverer of asteroids. The Minor Planet Center (MPC) credits him with the discovery of 35 numbered minor planets between 1997–1999. As of March 2016, the MPC ranks him 204th in the all-time, top-astronomer chart by number of discovered bodies. In January 2004, he co-discovered S/2003 (1089) 1, a minor planet moon orbiting the main-belt asteroid 1089 Tama.

The 7-kilometer sized main-belt asteroid 12580 Antonini, discovered by Laurent Bernasconi in 1999, was named in his honour.

List of discovered minor planets

See also 
 International Astronomical Union Circular
 List of French astronomers
 List of minor planet discoverers

References

External links 
 SN 2000B, images by P. Antonini

Discoverers of asteroids
Discoverers of supernovae

20th-century French astronomers
Living people
Year of birth missing (living people)